The fourth National Assembly of the Gambia was the legislature of the Gambia, elected at the 2012 parliamentary election and serving until the 2017 parliamentary election.

The 2012, election saw each of the Assembly's 48 directly-elected constituencies return one NAM, as well as each of the five nominated NAMs being appointed by the President of the Gambia, Yahya Jammeh. It resulted in an APRC majority of 48, with only one opposition NAM, Samba Jallow, being elected, as well as four independents.

National Assembly composition 
Below is a graphical representation of the National Assembly following the 2012 election, with 48 APRC NAMs, one NRP NAM, and four independent NAMs.

List of NAMs elected in 2012

Changes

By-elections

References 

Politics of the Gambia
Members of the National Assembly of the Gambia